Qahfarrokh Rural District is in Farrokhshahr District of Shahrekord County, Chaharmahal and Bakhtiari province, Iran. At the most recent National Census of 2016, its population was 979 in 301 households. Its only village was Kheyrabad, with 979 people.

References 

Shahrekord County

Rural Districts of Chaharmahal and Bakhtiari Province

Populated places in Chaharmahal and Bakhtiari Province

Populated places in Shahr-e Kord County

fa:دهستان قهفرخ